is a Japanese manga series written and illustrated by Takashi Shiina. It was published in Shogakukan's Weekly Shōnen Sunday from May 1991 to September 1999, with its chapters collected in thirty-nine tankobon volumes. The series explores some folk religion themes such as possession, exorcism, shamanism, Yurei, and Yōkai.

The series was adapted as a 45-episode anime television series by Toei Animation called Ghost Sweeper Mikami which ran on TV Asahi and the Asahi Broadcasting Corporation from 1993–1994, covering most parts of the first nine volumes of the Manga (total 39 volumes). The anime lead to the release of a movie, which had been the only existence of Mikami in the United States (released by Manga Video). The TV series has been licensed by Sentai Filmworks. In November 2013, Toei Animation released all of the episodes with English subtitles to YouTube.

In 1993, Ghost Sweeper Mikami won the 38th Shogakukan Manga Award for the shōnen category.

Plot

Overdevelopment and crowding in Japan has forced many of its indigenous spirits and ghosts to lose their homes. Due to problems caused by the homeless spirits, a new profession was created, the Ghost Sweepers (GS). Private exorcists for hire, they serve only the highest bidder to survive in the cutthroat corporate world. Among this, the Mikami GS Company, led by 28-year-old Reiko Mikami and her two assistants, the 17-year-old boy Tadao Yokoshima and the ghost girl Okinu, is said to be the best.

The manga setup is scenario-to-scenario, with many plots intertwining classic Japanese culture and modern day realities, with occasional references to Western influences. In between these plot points, there are longer story arcs where new characters are introduced and the existing characters are further developed. While the overarching storyline focuses on Reiko's contention with her arch-nemesis, Astaroth, the series is mostly character-driven and serves to gradually develop characters, especially the main protagonists.

Media

Manga
Ghost Sweeper Mikami, written and illustrated by Takashi Shiina, debuted as a one-shot in Shogakukan's Weekly Shōnen Sunday on May 8, 1991. The manga was then serialized in the same magazine from July 17, 1991, to September 22, 1999. Shogakukan collected its chapters in thirty-nine tankōbon volumes, released from March 18, 1992, to November 18, 1999. Shogakukan re-released the series in a twenty-volume wideban edition, published from December 16, 2002, to July 15, 2004; a twenty-volume shinsōban edition from June 16, 2006, to March 16, 2007; and a twenty-three volume bunkoban edition from August 18, 2016, to June 15, 2018.

Volume list

Anime

Episode list
There are 45 episodes which aired on TV from April 11, 1993 to March 6, 1994.

Film
A 1994 anime film was produced by Toei. Its story is original and acts as a sequel to the TV series.

Ghost Sweeper, Reiko Mikami, is called on by the ghost of the long dead samurai Mitsuhide Akechi to stop the demon Nobunaga who has been possessed by a vampire called Nosferatu. Nosferatu captures Mikami's associates, Emi Ogasawara, Doctor Chaos and Maria and begins to drain their blood. However, Mikami with the assistance of her friend, Yokoshima, manages to destroy Nosferatu with Mitsuhide's spear although Nosferatu says he will return in the future.

Video games

The manga and anime spawned two video games, one for the Super Famicom and another for the PC Engine. Released in 1993 for the Super Famicom, Natsume's  is a side-scrolling platform game where the player controls Reiko through multiple stages. Reiko is armed with a magic baton that can be used to perform several types of melee attacks. The baton can be powered up to shoot various types of projectiles, though these powerups are lost if Reiko takes any damage. It can also be used as a type of grappling hook to access certain platforms. There are also limited uses of magic attacks that hit all enemies on the screen.

Banpresto released another game based on the franchise in 1994 for the PC Engine Super CD-ROM² simply titled Ghost Sweeper Mikami , an adventure game featuring card battles.

Reception
In 1993, Ghost Sweeper Mikami, along Yaiba, received the 38th Shogakukan Manga Award for the shōnen category.

References

Further reading

External links

1991 manga
1993 anime television series debuts
1993 video games
1994 anime films
Asahi Broadcasting Corporation original programming
Comedy anime and manga
Exorcism in anime and manga
Gagaga Bunko
Japan-exclusive video games
Natsume (company) games
Platform games
Sentai Filmworks
Shogakukan manga
Shogakukan franchises
Shōnen manga
Super Nintendo Entertainment System games
Supernatural anime and manga
Toei Animation television
Toei Animation films
TV Asahi original programming
Video games scored by Kinuyo Yamashita
Video games developed in Japan
Winners of the Shogakukan Manga Award for shōnen manga
Yōkai in anime and manga